Constituyentes is a station on Line 7 of the Mexico City metro on the western outskirts of the city center.  It serves Chapultepec Park and numerous attractions therein, as well as the Luis Barragán House and Studio.  The station opened on 23 August 1985.

The station is named after the nearby Avenida Constituyentes. The station's icon shows a quill, a pot of ink and a book, in reference to the Mexican constitutions of 1824, 1857 and 1917. Constituyentes serves the San Miguel Chapultepec and Ampliación Daniel Garza neighborhoods, in the Miguel Hidalgo borough.

From 23 April to 17 June 2020, the station was temporarily closed due to the COVID-19 pandemic in Mexico.

Ridership

Nearby
Bosque de Chapultepec, city park and zoo.
Luis Barragán House and Studio, museum exhibiting Luis Barragán's work.
Los Pinos, official residence and office of the President of Mexico.

Exits
North: Av. Parque Lira and Av. Constituyentes, Colonia Ampliación Daniel Garza
South: Av. Parque Lira and Av. Constituyentes, Colonia Ampliación Daniel Garza

Gallery

References

External links
 

Constituyentes
Mexico City Metro stations in Miguel Hidalgo, Mexico City
Railway stations opened in 1985
1985 establishments in Mexico
Accessible Mexico City Metro stations